Jack Simon Oliver (born 4 January 1991) is a weightlifter competing in the 77 kg category, representing England and Great Britain.

Early life

Oliver was educated at Eltham College.

Career 
Oliver represented England at the Commonwealth games in Delhi in 2010, and competed in his first World Weightlifting Championships for Great Britain in Paris, France in 2011. That year, he also won the Commonwealth Championship.  In 2012 Oliver competed in the European Weightlifting Championships in Bucharest, and was later selected to represent Team GB at the 2012 Summer Olympics.

London 2012 Olympics
Oliver represented Team GB in the Olympic weightlifting at London 2012, competing in the 77 kg event.  Oliver was successful in two of his three snatch attempts at ExCeL, lifting 140 kg on his 3rd attempt. In the clean and jerk Oliver completed three good attempts, finishing with a lift of 170 kg giving him an 8 kg personal best. Oliver's total of 310 kg meant he finished 10th overall, the best result of any British weightlifter at the London 2012 games.

At the 2014 Commonwealth Games, he finished in 4th, lifting 142 kg in the snatch and 171 kg in the clean and jerk for a total of 313 kg.

At the 2018 Commonwealth Games, he won the silver medal the 77 kg division.  He lifted 145 kg in the snatch and 167 kg in the clean and jerk for a total of 312 kg.

He competed in the men's 73 kg event at the 2022 Commonwealth Games held in Birmingham, England.

Major results

References

External links
sports-reference.com

1991 births
Living people
British male weightlifters
Olympic weightlifters of Great Britain
Weightlifters at the 2012 Summer Olympics
Commonwealth Games medallists in weightlifting
Commonwealth Games silver medallists for England
Weightlifters at the 2022 Commonwealth Games
Weightlifters at the 2018 Commonwealth Games
Weightlifters at the 2010 Commonwealth Games
Weightlifters at the 2014 Commonwealth Games
People educated at Eltham College
People from Sidcup
20th-century British people
21st-century British people
Medallists at the 2018 Commonwealth Games